Kim Deuk-bong (born 20 January 1934) is a South Korean former boxer who competed as a light welterweight in the 1960 Summer Olympics. Kim lost his fourth fight, the quarterfinal match, to eventual silver-medalist Clement Quartey of Ghana.

Amateur career 
Kim first drew attention at the 1958 Asian Games in Tokyo where he protested against a decision by refusing to leave the ring after losing a controversial decision. When Kim fought Shigemasa Kawakami of Japan in the semifinal bout, he dominated his opponent in every round. However, when the judges' scores came up, Kim was judged to have lost to Kawakami. Seconds after the decision was made, Kim's entourage rushed the ring and his supporters in the stands began rioting, fighting with staff and policemen. Afterwards, Kim didn't leave the ring, sitting on a stool in his corner for hours.

At the 1960 Summer Olympics in Rome, Kim lost to eventual silver medalist Clement Quartey of Ghana by split decision in the quarterfinal match.

Kim won the gold medal in light welterweight at the 1962 Asian Games in Jakarta. At the 1964 Olympic Trials, Kim failed to qualify for his second Olympics, disqualified at the weigh-in for being over the light welterweight limit (under 63.5 kg) before the final bout.

Results

Professional career
After the 1964 Olympic trials, Kim subsequently made his professional debut in August 1964. In October 1964 Kim faced his fellow-Olympian and future world light middleweight champion Kim Ki-soo, and earned a draw. After six bouts, Kim fought future world light welterweight champion Takeshi Fuji in a non-title bout on January 20, 1966 in Tokyo. He was knocked out by the Japanese-Hawaiian legend in the 2nd round. After several lackluster competitions, Kim hung up his gloves.

References

1934 births
Living people
Light-welterweight boxers
Olympic boxers of South Korea
Boxers at the 1960 Summer Olympics
Asian Games medalists in boxing
Boxers at the 1958 Asian Games
Boxers at the 1962 Asian Games
South Korean male boxers
Asian Games gold medalists for South Korea
Asian Games bronze medalists for South Korea
Medalists at the 1958 Asian Games
Medalists at the 1962 Asian Games
People from Geoje
Sportspeople from South Gyeongsang Province